Daniel Wolf is a New Hampshire politician.

Early life
Wolf earned a Bachelor of Arts degree from Nasson College.

Career
Wolf previously served as chairman of the Kearsarge Regional School Board. Wolf is the president of Hodan Properties, a real estate service. He currently serves as chairman of the Newbury Trustee of the Trust Fund. On November 8, 2016, Wolf was elected to the New Hampshire House of Representatives where he represents the Merrimack 5 district. He assumed office on December 7, 2016. He is a Republican.

Personal life
Wolf resides in Newbury, New Hampshire. Wolf is married and has two children.

References

Living people
Republican Party members of the New Hampshire House of Representatives
People from Merrimack County, New Hampshire
School board members in New Hampshire
21st-century American politicians
Year of birth missing (living people)